(2-Hydroxyethyl) dimethylsulfoxonium chloride is an organic salt found in sea chervils and sponges that causes the Dogger Bank itch.

Properties
(2-Hydroxyethyl) dimethylsulfoxonium chloride is colourless. It dissolves in dioxane, methanol, chloroform or water.

(2-Hydroxyethyl) dimethylsulfoxonium chloride is a sulfoxonium compound, with a sulfur atom having a positive charge. Attached to the sulfur are two methyl groups, and oxygen atom, and an ethoxy group attached at the number 2 carbon.

As a solid, its crystal structure is orthorhombic, with unit cell dimensions a = 11.033, b = 13.847 and c = 9.871 Å. The space group is Pbca. There are eight formulae per unit cell. The density is 1.251 g/cm3.

Natural occurrence
(2-Hydroxyethyl) dimethylsulfoxonium chloride has been discovered so far in Alcyonidium gelatinosum and a sea sponge.

References

Sponge toxins
Sulfonium compounds
Chlorides
Primary alcohols